Version history for TLS/SSL support in web browsers tracks the implementation of Transport Layer Security protocol versions in major web browsers.

Notes

References

Transport Layer Security
History of computer networks
History of the Internet